CGS-21680 is a specific adenosine A2A subtype receptor agonist. It is usually presented as an organic hydrochloride salt with a molecular weight of 536.0 g/M. It is soluble up to 3.4 mg/mL in DMSO and 20 mg/mL in 45% (w/v) aq 2-hydroxypropyl-β-cyclodextrin.

The chemical is currently used by researchers interested in studying neuronal transmission with a high-affinity, subtype specific analogue for adenosine. This includes research in respiration where it is believed that A2A receptors are involved in rhythm generation in the pre-Bötzinger complex. The drug is not currently approved for use in a therapeutic capacity.

See also
 Adenosine receptor

References
 
 

Nucleosides
Purines
Carboxamides
Adenosine receptor agonists